Heroes or Héroes may refer to:
 Hero, one who displays courage and self-sacrifice for the greater good

Film 
 Heroes (1977 film), an American drama 
 Heroes (2008 film), an Indian Hindi film

Gaming
 Heroes of Might and Magic or Heroes, a series of video games
Heroes of the Storm or Heroes, a 2015 video game 
 Heroes (role-playing game) (1979)
 Heros: The Sanguine Seven, a 1993 video game
 Sonic Heroes, a 2003 video game in the Sonic the Hedgehog franchise

Literature 
 Heroes (book series), short novels and plays intended for young boys
 Heroes (comics), a 1996 comic book by DC Comics
 Heroes (novel), a 1998 novel by Robert Cormier
 Heroes (play), a translation by Tom Stoppard of Le Vent Des Peupliers by Gérald Sibleyras
 Heroes: Saving Charlie, a 2007 novel based on the American TV series Heroes
 Heroes, a role-playing game magazine by Avalon Hill
 Heroes, a 2018 collection of stories from ancient Greek mythology by Stephen Fry

Music 
 Heroes (Australian band), 1980s band
 Héroes del Silencio or Héroes, a Spanish rock band
 Heroes, a British band formed by Wang Chung member Darren Costin

Albums 
 Heroes (Michael Ball album) (2011)
 Heroes (David Benoit album) (2008)
 "Heroes" (David Bowie album) (1977)
 Symphony No. 4 (Glass) or "Heroes" Symphony, a symphony by Philip Glass inspired by the album
 Heroes (Johnny Cash and Waylon Jennings album) (1986)
 Heroes (Commodores album) (1980)
 Heroes (Gil Evans and Lee Konitz album), an album recorded in 1980 and released in 1991
 Heroes (HOCC album) (2009)
 Heroes (Icehouse album) (2004)
 Heroes (J. J. Johnson album) (1998)
 Heroes (Willie Nelson album) (2012)
 Heroes (Mark O'Connor album) (1993)
 Heroes (Paul Overstreet album) (1991)
 Heroes (Sabaton album) (2014)
 War Child Presents Heroes (2009)
 Heroes: Original Soundtrack, a 2008 soundtrack album from the American TV series
 Heroes: Original Score (2009)

Songs 
 "Heroes (We Could Be)", a 2014 song by Alesso
 Heroes (David Bowie song) (1977)
 "Heroes" (Amanda Cook song) (2015)
 "Heroes" (Flying Lotus song) (2019)
 "Heroes" (Tee Grizzley song) (2019)
 "Heroes" (Mika song) (2012)
 "Heroes" (Paul Overstreet song) (1991)
 "Heroes" (Helena Paparizou song) (2006)
 "Heroes" (Shinedown song) (2006)
 "Heroes" (Tinie Tempah song) (2013)
 "Heroes" (Conchita Wurst song) (2014)
 "Heroes" (Måns Zelmerlöw song) (2015)
 "Heroes", a 2008 song by David Cook from David Cook
 "Heroes", a 1997 song by Roni Size & Reprazent from New Forms

Sports 
 Hyderabad Heroes, an Indian cricket team
 Kiwoom Heroes, a South Korean baseball team

Television

Series 
 Heroes (American TV series), a 2006–2010 superhero drama
 Héroes (Chilean miniseries), a 2007 historical drama
 Heroes (South Korean TV series), a variety show
 Heroes: Legend of the Battle Disks, a 2015 anime series

Episodes 
 "Heroes" (Batman Beyond) (1999)
 "Heroes" (Beavis and Butthead) (1993)
 "Heroes" (Better Off Ted) (2009)
 "Heroes" (CSI: NY) (2006)
 "Heroes" (The Professionals) (1978)
 "Heroes" (Stargate SG-1) (2004)
 "Heroes", a  Thomas & Friends episode (1992)

Other uses 
 Heroes (confectionery), a brand of confectionery by Cadbury
 Héroes (TransMilenio), a bus station in Bogotá, Colombia
 Héroes-Canosas (Mexibús), a BRT station in Coacalco de Berriozábal, Mexico
 Los Héroes metro station, in Santiago, Chile
 HEROES Act, proposed American legislation
 Heroes Comics, a Canadian book store

See also 

 Hero (disambiguation)
 The Heroes (disambiguation)
 Heroes and Villains (disambiguation)
 Heroes Reborn (miniseries)
 Heros (disambiguation)
 Hero's, a martial arts organization based in Japan